Behavioural Brain Research is a peer-reviewed scientific journal published by Elsevier. The journal publishes articles in the field of behavioural neuroscience. Volume 1 appeared in 1980 and issues appeared 6 times per year; as submissions increased it switched to a higher frequency and currently 20 issues per year are published.

Abstracting and indexing
The journal is abstracted and indexed in Animal Behavior Abstracts, BIOSIS Previews, Chemical Abstracts Service, Current Contents/Life Sciences, EMBASE, MEDLINE, PsycINFO, Science Citation Index, and Scopus. According to the Journal Citation Reports, its 2020 impact factor is 3.332.

References

External links

Neuroscience journals
Publications established in 1980
English-language journals
Elsevier academic journals